So Much So Fast is a documentary film written and directed by Academy Award nominees Steven Ascher and Jeanne Jordan. It premiered in competition at the 2006 Sundance Film Festival, and won the Audience Award at the Boston Independent Film Festival.

Synopsis
So Much So Fast documents 5 years in the life of Stephen Heywood who, at 29, discovers he had the paralyzing neurodegenerative disease Amyotrophic lateral sclerosis (Lou Gehrig's disease).

Determined to live as well as possible, Stephen gets married, has a son and rebuilds two houses. His and his wife Wendy's observations of the world and his disease explore the fragility of life.

The film also tracks his family's response to the drug companies that ignore his disease because there is not enough profit in curing it, and his brother, Jamie Heywood's, creation of the ALS Therapy Development Foundation research facility to find a cure for Stephen's disease in time.

External links
Official Film Site

Film trailer
So Much So Fast Frontline

2006 films
Documentary films about people with motor neuron disease
2006 documentary films
American documentary films
2000s English-language films
2000s American films